In Catholicism "of pontifical right" is the term given to ecclesiastical institutions (religious and secular institutes, societies of apostolic life) either created by the Holy See, or approved by it with the formal decree known by the Latin name Decretum laudis ["decree of praise"]. The term is included in the names of institutions, often capitalised in English: "Institute of [xxx] of Pontifical Right".

The institutions of pontifical right depend immediately and exclusively on the Holy See on matters of internal governance and discipline.

History
Until the 19th century religious communities were divided into two groups: regular orders with solemn vows and congregations of simple vows. Only those taking the solemn vows were valued by the Church and the civil authorities.

In 1215, in the Fourth Lateran Council, Pope Innocent III decreed that no regular orders could be founded without papal approval. The bishops, however, retained the right to form communities whose members lived the religious life without taking formal vows.  These groups later took the name of "congregations of simple vows".

The number of congregations of simple vows, especially women's, were increasing dramatically during the 17th and 18th centuries. In the early 19th century, many were seeking papal recognition from Rome. in 1816 the Holy See began to approve the congregations with simple vows, but they were still not recognized as religious institutions.

In 1854 Giuseppe Andrea Bizzarri, the Secretary of the Sacred Congregation for Consultations About Regulars, created on the behalf of Pope Pius IX a procedure for the approval of congregations of simple vows. This was communicated to the bishops in 1861.

With this new procedure, the distinction was formally made for the creation of an institute, operated by a bishop, and its approval by the Holy See. After its foundation, the institute (i.e., congregation) would have the status "of diocesan right".  Under this status, the institute would remain under the protection of the bishops of the diocese where it was founded, increasing its importance. If the Holy See grants the institute the decretum laudis [decree of approval], the institute would be placed under its direct protection. The institute would thus acquire the status "of pontifical right".

The distinction between the legal status of an institute of diocesan right and an institute of pontifical right was permanently drawn on 8 December 1900 by Conditae a Christo Ecclesiae [Latin, “Founded by the Church of Christ”], the apostolic constitution of Pope Leo XIII.

References

Bibliography
 

Catholic canon law of religious